The 1961 Copa del Generalísimo Juvenil was the 11th staging of the tournament. The competition began on May 21, 1961, and ended on July 2, 1961, with the final.

First round

|}

Quarterfinals

|}

Semifinals

|}

Final

|}

Copa del Rey Juvenil de Fútbol
Juvenil